Feng Zhigang (Chinese: 冯志刚; 27 February 1969 – 7 July 2011) was a Chinese football forward who played for China PR in the 1992 Asian Cup. In the aspect of club football, he played for Wuhan Hongtao K and Qianwei Huandao.

Playing career
Feng Zhigang was born in Wuhan on 27 February 1969. His playing position is defender. From 1992 to 1995, Feng Zhigang played for Wuhan Steelworks football club. From 1996 to 1998, Feng Zhigang joined Qianwei Huandao. From 2001 to 2008, Feng Zhigang returned and played for Wuhan Hongtao K until he retired. Feng Zhigang entered the China national football team in 1992 and has played for China PR in the 1992 Asian Cup.

Management career
Feng Zhigang retired in 2001, then he worked as assistant coach of Wuhan Hongtao K. In 2008, Wuhan Hongtao K quit the Chinese Super League. Feng Zhigang went to work as assistant coach of Shaanxi Baorong Chanba.

Death
On November 27, 2009,  Feng Zhigang suffered a sudden cerebral hemorrhage in Wuhan metro supermarket when he was shopping. Family members sent him to the Wuhan University zhongnan hospital for emergency treatment. After two operations, Feng Zhigang remained in a coma.
On July 7, 2011, Feng Zhigang died in hospital, at the age of 42.

Honours
Qianwei Huandao
Jia B League: 1996

References

External links
Team China Stats

1969 births
2011 deaths
Chinese footballers
1992 AFC Asian Cup players
China international footballers
Chongqing Liangjiang Athletic F.C. players
Wuhan Guanggu players
Footballers from Wuhan
Association football defenders